General elections were held in Denmark on 23 January 1968. The Social Democratic Party remained the largest in the Folketing, with 62 of the 179 seats. Voter turnout was 89% in Denmark proper, 57% in the Faroe Islands and 56% in Greenland. They were the last elections in which the old counties were used as constituencies.

Results

References

Elections in Denmark
Denmark
1968 elections in Denmark
January 1968 events in Europe